Liga Deportiva Universitaria de Quito's 1977 season was the club's 47th year of existence, the 24th year in professional football and the 17th in the top level of professional football in Ecuador.

Squad

Competitions

Serie A

First stage

Results

Second stage

Results

Liguilla Final

Results

References
RSSSF - 1977 Serie A

External links
Official Site 
LDU Quito (3) - Barcelona SC (0)

1977